The Bierville Elegies is the most outstanding work by the Catalan poet Carles Riba. Once Riba and his family embarked on the path of exile in France at the end of the Spanish Civil War, they settled first in the castle of Bierville (Boissy-la-Rivière) and there, between March and July 1939, began to be created what were later to become the Elegies. The work was continued between July 1939 and June 1940 in L'Isle-Adam, then for eight months in Bordeaux and given final shape in Montpellier, where he settled. Along with Nabí by Josep Carner and Antigone by Salvador Espriu, The Elegies of Bierville constitute one of the great works of modern Catalan literature and the prime postwar pieces marked by the political situation.

Written between 1939 and 1942, the Elegies were published in Barcelona after a year in an edition that bore the imprint of Buenos Aires and dated as 1942; this edition was shortened, however. In 1949 in Santiago, Chile the first complete edition of the work was published, but the distance meant that this work was unknown to the Catalan public. Finally, the complete edition came out in 1951 in Barcelona and quickly made a big impact.

In the Elegies the poet melts three very different realities, which are fostered by loneliness and lack of history of the landscape of Bierville and become almost legendary: the poet's self, that of his people, and a common homeland of Greece, to which the poet is now traveling, now that he is not in his own homeland. It is, in fact, a spiritual adventure, represented through a journey into the past powered by the memory, preferably with an image of the sea, which ends in the penultimate elegy in the collection, which has been considered a kind of a spiritual song, with the rediscovery of own identity and personal divinity of God and of the collectivity. This religious dimension, which until then was not present in Riba's poetry, penetrated deeply throughout his thinking, including the conception of literature. That dimension appeared again in the later poetic works as Savage Heart (Salvatge cor) and Sketch of Three Oratorios (Esbós de tres oratoris).

References

 Pàgina dedicada a Carles Riba a Lletra, espai virtual de literatura catalana

Catalan-language works
20th-century poems
Philosophical poems